The Apolaki Caldera is a volcanic crater with a diameter of , making it the world's largest caldera. It is located within the Benham Rise (Philippine Rise) and was discovered in 2019 by Jenny Anne Barretto, a Filipina marine geophysicist and her team. The name "Apolaki" means "giant lord" in Filipino, and is also the name of the god of sun and war in some pantheons in Philippine mythology and the indigenous Philippine folk religions.

Geological history

Gravimetric analysis shows that the Benham Rise, as the submarine mountain massif is named, is made up of a nine mile thick layer of magmatic and volcanic rocks. Rock samples ages range from 47.9 to 26 million years, when volcanic activity made up the massif.

References

Volcanoes of Luzon
Calderas of the Philippines
Submarine volcanoes